{{Infobox television
| alt_name             = Los Supergenios de la Mesa Cuadrada (1970)Chespirito y la Mesa Cuadrada (1970–1971)
| image                = Chespirito.png
| runtime              = 30 minutes (1970–1971; 1993-1994; 1994-1995); 45 minutes (1971); 60 minutes (1971-1973; 1980–1993; 1994)
| camera               = Multi-camera
| creator              = Roberto Gómez Bolaños
| starring             = Roberto Gómez Bolaños (1980-1995)María Antonieta de las Nieves (1980-1994)Florinda Meza (1980–1990; 1991–1995) Ramón Valdés (1981–1982)Rubén Aguirre (1980–1995)Angelines Fernández (1980–1991)Edgar Vivar (1980–1990; 1992–1995) Horacio Gómez Bolaños (1980–1995)Raúl 'Chato' Padilla (1980; 1982–1994)Benny Ibarra (1980-1982)Roberto Gómez Fernández (1984-1985; 1987-1988)Carlos Pouliot (1987-1992)Anabel Gutiérrez (1987–1989; 1991-1995) Moisés Suárez (1980-1985; 1990; 1992–1995)Paulina Gómez (1992-1995)Arnoldo Picazzo (1994-1995)
| opentheme            = "The Elephant Never Forgets", by Jean-Jacques Perrey (1980-1981) 
"El Chapulín Colorado", by Víctor Arcos (1981-1993) 
"El Chapulín Colorado", by Rodolfo 'Popo' Sánchez (1993-1995)
| director             = Sergio Peña and Alberto del Bosque (1970-1973) / Roberto Gómez Bolaños and Roberto Gómez Fernández (1980-1995)
| company              = Televisa
| country              = Mexico
| language             = Spanish
| network              = El Canal de las Estrellas
| first_aired          = 
| last_aired           = 
|picture_format        =NTSC
| num_seasons          = 16
| num_episodes         = 692 approximately (1980-1995)
}}Chespirito is a Mexican sketch comedy show created by and starring comedian and actor Roberto Gomez Bolaños, whose nickname gave the show its title.

Two series were produced with the same title. The first premiered as Los Supergenios de la Mesa Cuadrada on Televisión Independiente de México on October 15, 1970, after a two-year span of this sketch being part of the Sábados de la Fortuna/Sábados con Neftalí/Carrousel con Neftalí show (hosted by Neftalí Lopez Paez), aired in the same channel, since October 1968, during the 1968 Summer Olympics in Mexico City; the independent series adopted the Chespirito y La Mesa Cuadrada and later the Chespirito title in 1971, and aired until February 1973. The second series, which aired on the TIM's successor, Televisa, premiered on 4 February 1980 and aired until 25 September 1995.

Alongside Bolaños, other famous Mexican actors starred in the sketches. In the two periods, characters like El Chavo del Ocho, El Chapulín Colorado, Los Caquitos, Dr. Chapatín, Los Chifladitos, El Ciudadano Gómez, La Chicharra, Chespirito (character), Los Chiripiojos and the parodies of Chaplin and Laurel and Hardy starred in sketches 2–15 minutes long. The 1980-1995 period also featured special 40-minute episodes, even consisting of two or three 40-minute long parts.

The show's first seasons featured a canned laugh track, but Bolaños made the then-controversial decision to drop it, in 1982, after the departure of Ramón Valdés. From 1982 to 1985, most presentations of the show include the announcer's warning that, out of respect for the audience's intelligence, there was no laugh track.

History

First period (1968–1970; Block of Los sábados de la fortuna; 1970-1973; Standalone)

In 1968, Roberto Gómez Bolaños created and starred in a segment named Los Supergenios de la Mesa Cuadrada, in the show Sábados de la Fortuna of Televisión Independiente de México's XHTM-TV channel 8. The segment eventually became a separate show of its own due to its success. In this show, Chespirito read "letters" sent by the show's audience, most of which made fun of current events. Alongside him, Ramón Valdés, Rubén Aguirre, Aníbal de Mar (who left the cast after a short time), and Barbara Ramson (who was later replaced by María Antonieta de las Nieves) also starred in the show, not only about the "letters", but also playing characters in other sketches eventually created by Bolaños. Los Supergenios was presented by Dr. Chespirito Chapatín (Bolaños), El Ingeniebrio Ramón Valdés Tirado Alanis (Valdés), El Profesor Rubén Aguire Jirafales (Aguirre), Anibal and a “secretary” first played by Barbara Ramson and later replaced by La Mococha Pechocha, or, La Marioneta (played by Ma. Antonieta, who also went on to read the letters upon Anibal de Mar's departure) at a square table where they read the letters and comment about them. Sometimes the letters were answered by sketches. In one sketch, a viewer of the show asked what to do when a crazed person put a giant rock in the door of his house, then a sketch starring María Antonieta de las Nieves, Rubén Aguirre and Ramón Valdes showed the solution to his problem.

In 1970, Carlos Villagrán and Florinda Meza were added to the show's cast, playing secondary characters. In the same year, Bolaños decided to end the run of the ‘supergenios’ sketch and rename the show as Chespirito, and created the successful sketches of El Chapulín Colorado and Los Caquitos to replace it. From then on the sketches featured in the show were El Chapulín Colorado, Dr. Chapatín, Los Caquitos, Chespirito and Los Chifladitos.

In 1972, Rubén Aguirre left the cast of Chespirito to host another show El Club de Shory in a rival network; El Shory was a nickname of Aguirre. Bolaños then created his most successful character, El Chavo del Ocho, to fill in the void left by the sketch Los Chifladitos, starring Bolaños and Aguirre, that had to be eliminated when Aguirre left.

By 1972, the show was almost entirely made of El Chavo del Ocho and El Chapulín Colorado. Then Bolaños decided to end the Chespirito show to star in the half-hour weekly series of El Chavo del Ocho, El Chapulín Colorado, and also a short lived series called Ciudadano Gomez, a parody of Citizen Kane. Aguirre returned to the show in the last episodes of Chespirito. That same year, channel 8 Television Independiente de Mexico was acquired by rival network Telesistema Mexicano and the new company resulting from the merger was renamed as Televisa. Then Bolaños’ shows were all moved to Televisa's channel 2 and El chavo del Ocho was renamed simply as El Chavo (though the original name was still constantly repeated by the characters in every episode of the series).

Second period (1980–1995)

After the end of the half-hour series of El Chavo and El Chapulín Colorado in 1979, as well as the flop of La Chicharra, Bolaños decided to return the successful sketch comedy format of Los Supergenios in 1980 with the second version of the Chespirito show. The show featured the famous characters of Chespirito in a 60-minute show, El Chavo, El Chapulín Colorado, Los Caquitos, Los Chifladitos, La Chicharra, and the late introduction of Don Calavera in 1994, alongside the remake of El Ciudadano Gómez. The parodies of Chaplin and Laurel and Hardy were also introduced in 1980.
 
Ramón Valdés returned to the show in 1981, playing only Don Ramón in El Chavo and Súper Sam and the villains in El Chapulín Colorado. He also acted in other sketches with secondary characters (with the exception of Vicente Chambón and Laurel and Hardy). Valdés left the show in late 1981 for unknown reasons (rumored to be for disliking Bolaños relinquishing directive control to Florinda Meza) and went on to star in a couple of shows along with Carlos Villagran. In 1981, Benny Ibarra starred in some sketches as a secondary character.

In 1982, Benny Ibarra returned playing a secondary character in the sketch "Los Piratas" of El Chapulín Colorado and "Sr. Hurtado" in El Chavo. Raúl "Chato" Padilla returned to the show after to substitute for Valdés. The character "Jaimito, el cartero", of El Chavo, became "Señor Jaimito" and started living in the vecindad. His character got all the characteristics of Don Ramón, a change which was heavily criticized by fans.

In 1984, Roberto Gómez Fernández, Bolaños' son, became another member of the cast.

In 1986, Roberto Gómez Fernández and his uncle, Horacio Gómez Bolaños, became directors of the show. Horacio now starred only as Godínez in El Chavo, as well as secondary characters in other sketches.

In 1987, various guest actors played secondary characters in sketches of the show. Also, El Chavo and El Chapulín Colorado became less important to the show. The same happened to the other characters, and with Bolaños giving attention to the sketch Chómpiras, the sketch virtually became a half-hour series inside the show.

On August 9, 1988, Ramón Valdés died of stomach cancer, after a long agony in the hospital. Bolaños was the only friend of Valdés who didn't attend the funeral. Carlos Villagrán, Edgar Vivar, Rubén Aguirre and Angelines Fernández were some of his friends from El Chavo who attended the funeral. María Antonieta de las Nieves became very worried of not knowing of his condition in his last moments of life, and sad not to have been able to attend his funeral, due to her being on tour in Peru at the time of his death (Peru was also where she had last seen him a year before).

In 1991, Florinda Meza left the show to star the telenovela Milagro y magia. After the end of the telenovela, she returned to the cast of the show. Angelines Fernández left the show at the end of the year due to her lung cancer.

In 1992, Bolaños ended the sketches of El Chavo, since he was too old to play the role of an 8-year-old boy. Also, Edgar Vivar left the show temporarily because of his obesity.

In 1993, the sketch of El Chapulín Colorado ended.

In 1994, the sketch El Ciudadano Gómez, parody of Citizen Kane returned to Dr. Chapatín, Chómpiras and Los Chifladitos in the show. Raul "Chato" Padilla left the show, passing away on February 3 of that year. On March 25, Angelines Fernández also died of lung cancer; Angelines was an acknowledged tobacco smoker.

In September 1995, Televisa decided to eliminate all comedy and sitcom shows airing on weeknights at 8 o’clock and use that timeslot for more telenovelas (Mexican soap operas), while offering to transfer only the Chespirito comedy show and Silvia Pinal's TV show to a timeslot on weekends. Because of this, Bolaños preferred to end the 15-year-old Chespirito show.

After the show

Roberto Gómez Bolaños and Florinda Meza continued for some years the theater play 11 y 12 (also created and produced by Bolaños), which became very successful in Mexico and Latin America.

In 1997, the show was dubbed in Portuguese, especially to Brazil, renamed Clube do Chaves.

On November 21, 1999, Horacio Gómez Bolaños (younger brother of Roberto) died of a heart attack.

On November 19, 2004, Roberto married Florinda Meza after dating for a long time.

In 2006, an animated series featuring the characters of El Chavo premiered. It ran for several seasons until 2014.

In 2007, the channel Clásico TV reran "Chespirito" episodes dating from 1980 to 1995. The series finale was broadcast in July 2012. In October 2012 the channel was renamed Distrito Comedia. The series was transmitted on the weekends (2007–2011) and Monday to Friday (2011–present).

In 2008, the channel Clásico TV returned with Los Supergenios de la Mesa Cuadrada, the first period of the Chespirito'' show, which was transmitted on Wednesdays. The series finale was broadcast in 2009.
 
On November 28, 2014, Roberto Gómez Bolaños passed away at age 85.

In 2015, an animated series featuring El Chapulín Colorado premiered.

Opening

Sketches

El Chavo del Ocho (1972–1973)
El Chavo, El Chavo del Ocho reboot (1980-1992)
El Chapulín Colorado (1970–1973; 1980–1993)
Dr. Chapatín (1972–1973; 1980–1992; 1993; 1994–1995)
Los Caquitos (1970–1973)
El Chómpiras, Los Caquitos reboot (1980–1990; 1991–1995)
Vicente Chambón, La Chicharra reboot (1980–1984)
Chespirito (Sketch) (1970–1972; 1980–1992; 1994–1995)
Los Supergenios de la Mesa Cuadrada (1970–1972)
Los Chifladitos (1970–1972)
Chaparron Bonaparte, Los Chifladitos reboot (1980-1992; 1993; 1994-1995)
Chaplin (1980–1983; 1991)
Laurel and Hardy (1980–1982; 1984; 1988)
Don Calavera (1993–1994)
Ciudadano Gómez, parody of Citizen Kane (1970; 1973; 1993–1994)
Al Estilo del Cine Mudo (1993–1995)
Mini Teatro (1993–1995)
Increible Pero Ciento Por Ciento (1993–1995)
La Noticia Rebelde (1993–1995)
Con Humor al estilo... Chespirito (1993–1994)
La Noticia Rebelde (1993–1994)

Cast

The cast of the show in both periods.

See also
 El Chavo del Ocho
 El Chapulín Colorado
 Sketch comedy

References

External links
 
Unofficial websites:
 Chespirito.org
 Web-site of El Chavo del Ocho
 Web-site of El Chapulín Colorado

Mexican sketch comedy television series
TV series
1960s Mexican television series
1970s Mexican television series
1980s Mexican television series
1990s Mexican television series
1968 Mexican television series debuts
1973 Mexican television series endings
1980 Mexican television series debuts
1995 Mexican television series endings
El Chavo del Ocho
Chespirito characters